Anton Lindskog, (born 7 December 1993 in Kristianstad) is a Swedish handball player for SG Flensburg-Handewitt. He was part of the squad in the Swedish national team that won a silvermedal in the World championship 2021 in Egypt.

References

Swedish male handball players
1993 births
Living people
People from Kristianstad Municipality
Handball players at the 2020 Summer Olympics
Olympic handball players of Sweden
Sportspeople from Skåne County
21st-century Swedish people